Edward Anton Mikan (October 20, 1925 – October 22, 1999) was an American professional basketball player. He was the younger brother of George Mikan.

After starring at Joliet Catholic High School in Illinois, the 6'8" Mikan joined the DePaul Blue Demons men's basketball team. With his brother, he helped DePaul win the 1945 National Invitational Tournament Championship over Bowling Green State University. Coach Ray Meyer said that he "was probably the second-best center we ever had at DePaul, only behind his brother George".

From 1948 to 1954, Ed Mikan played in the National Basketball Association as a member of the Chicago Stags, Rochester Royals, Washington Capitols, Philadelphia Warriors, Indianapolis Olympians, and Boston Celtics. He averaged 6.7 points and 5.5 rebounds per game in his NBA career. His best year statistically was his rookie season, when he averaged 9.9 points.

Mikan later worked as the supervisor of officials for the American Basketball Association, then focused his attention on his insurance and real estate business.

BAA/NBA career statistics

Regular season

Playoffs

References

External links

1925 births
1999 deaths
American men's basketball players
Basketball players from Illinois
Boston Celtics players
Centers (basketball)
Chicago Stags draft picks
Chicago Stags players
DePaul Blue Demons men's basketball players
Indianapolis Olympians players
Philadelphia Warriors players
Power forwards (basketball)
Rochester Royals players
Washington Capitols players
American people of Croatian descent
American people of Lithuanian descent